The Haugesund/Karmøy/Stord Region is a metropolitan region in the counties of Rogaland and Hordaland in Western Norway.  The region is centered on the cities of Haugesund, Kopervik, and Leirvik.  It has about 140,000 inhabitants
.

References

Metropolitan regions of Norway
Haugesund
Stord